Lazdijai District Municipality is a municipality in Alytus County, Lithuania.

Seniūnijos (Elderships or Wards) 
The Lazdijai district municipality contains 14 seniūnijos (in English: elderships or wards); the main town or village is listed for each.

  – 
  – Kapčiamiestis
  – Krosna
  – 
  – Lazdijai
  – Lazdijai
  – 
  – Seirijai
  – Šeštokai
  – 
  – Šventežeris
  – 
  – Veisiejai
  – Veisiejai

Population by locality

Status: M, MST - city, town / K, GST - village / VS - steading

References

Municipalities of Alytus County
Municipalities of Lithuania